MECON Limited, formerly known as Metallurgical & Engineering Consultants (India) Limited is a central public sector undertaking. It is under the ownership of Ministry of Steel,  Government of India.  It began in 1959 as the Central Engineering and Designing Bureau (CEDB) of the Hindustan Steel Limited (HSL), the first public sector steel company.

Notes
Article; in Telegraph India; retrieved .

References

External links
MECON Home page

Government-owned companies of India
Companies based in Jharkhand
Engineering companies of India
Construction and civil engineering companies established in 1959
Ministry of Steel
1959 establishments in Bihar